Governor Almond may refer to:

J. Lindsay Almond (1898–1986), Governor of Virginia
Lincoln Almond (born 1936), Governor of Rhode Island